Genicanthus semifasciatus, the  Japanese swallow, is a species of marine ray-finned fish, a marine angelfish, belonging to the family Pomacanthidae. It is found in the Western Pacific.

Description
Genicanthus semifasciatus is sexually dichromatic; the males and females show different colouration and patterning. The male has a yellow head and anterior flanks with a darker yellow dorsal area which is marked with dusky vertical bars. The dorsal area of females is greyish brown and white ventrally, with a yellow margin to the dorsal fin with a black head and caudal fin, and black on the head and tail. In both sexes the forked tail narrows at its base to create a "swallow tail". The dorsal fin contains 15 spines and 15-16 soft rays while the anal fin has 3 spines and 17 soft rays.

Distribution
Genicanthus semifasciatus is found in the Western Pacific Ocean. Here it is found from southern Japan, including the Ogasawara Islands, the Izu Islands and the Ryukyu Islands, to the northern Philippines.

Habitat and biology
Here it can be found on the seaward sides of rocky and coral reefs. This species is protogynously hermaphroditic and is normally encountered in harems consisting of a male and several females. It feeds on plankton in the water column.

Systematics
Genicanthus semifasciatus was first formally described in 1934 as Holocanthus semifasciatus by the Japanese ichthyologist Toshiji Kamohara (1901-1972) with the type locality given as Kashiwajima in the Kochi Prefecture of Japan. The specific name is a compound of semi  meaning “half” and fasciatus  meaning “banded”, referring to the banding on the males’ backs which does not extend onto the abdomen.

Utilisation
Genicanthus semifasciatus is rather infrequently found in the aquarium trade. The specimens which do appear in the trade usually come from the Philippines.

References

semifasciatus
Taxa named by Toshiji Kamohara
Fish described in 1934